Marc Delorme (born June 19, 1970) is a Canadian former professional ice hockey goaltender.

Prior to turning professional, Delorme played major junior hockey in the Quebec Major Junior Hockey League.

Awards and honours

References

External links

1970 births
Living people
Anchorage Aces players
Birmingham Bulls players
Brantford Smoke players
Canadian ice hockey goaltenders
Detroit Vipers players
French Quebecers
Ice hockey people from Montreal
Louisiana IceGators (ECHL) players
Philadelphia Bulldogs players
Reno Rage players
Saginaw Gears players
Saint-Jean Lynx players
Shawinigan Cataractes players
Trois-Rivières Draveurs players
Winston-Salem IceHawks players
New Jersey Rockin' Rollers players
Montreal Roadrunners players